Richard Johnston (born 26 February 1980 in Neath, Wales) first started his career at Neath RFC in 1998 where he gained representative honours for Wales under 18/19s. In 2000 Richard signed for Pontypridd RFC where he spent three years. In his time at Ponty, Richard was selected for Wales U21s and Wales 7s and was involved in the squad that won the Welsh Cup in 2002 and narrowly lost to Sale in the Parker Pen European Shield Final. After regional rugby was formed he returned to Neath RFC winning the league twice and Welsh Cup in a three-year stint. Richard then changed codes, signing for Crusader RL and won 4 caps for Wales. He also played on the 7s circuit playing for Samurai 7s, White Hart Marauders, Crusaders and Scorpions.  In 2007 Richard left rugby to pursue a career outside sport but continues to play on the 7s circuit and now vets competitions.

References

1980 births
Living people
Crusaders Rugby League players
Footballers who switched code
Neath RFC players
Pontypridd RFC players
Rugby league articles needing expert attention
Rugby league players from Neath
Rugby union players from Neath
Wales national rugby league team players
Welsh rugby league players
Welsh rugby union players
Rugby union articles needing expert attention